Aleksandrówka  is a village in the administrative district of Gmina Dalików, within Poddębice County, Łódź Voivodeship, in central Poland.

Villages in Poddębice County